Francis Joe Mensah (born 17 January 1988 in Kumasi) is a Ghanaian footballer. He currently plays for Feyenoord Academy.

Career

He began his career by Feyenoord Academy, joined than on 12 January 2009 on loan to ASEC Mimosas.

Attributes
Mensah a lightning-quick, technically solid, left back, who can also play left wing.

References

1988 births
Living people
Ghanaian footballers
Expatriate footballers in Ivory Coast
West African Football Academy players
Association football midfielders
Ghanaian expatriate sportspeople in Ivory Coast